Samuel Biek (born 7 August 1997) is a German professional footballer who plays as a centre-back for Regionalliga Nordost club Rot-Weiß Erfurt.

Career

FC Tucson
In July 2020, Biek signed with FC Tucson of USL League One. He made his league debut for the club on 25 July 2020 against Fort Lauderdale CF.

SV Horn
On 2 July 2021, he joined Austrian club SV Horn.

Rot-Weiß Erfurt
On 12 July 2022, Biek joined Regionalliga Nordost club Rot-Weiß Erfurt.

References

External links
Samuel Biek at Western Michigan University Athletics

1997 births
Living people
German footballers
Association football defenders
National Premier Soccer League players
USL League One players
Western Michigan Broncos men's soccer players
Milwaukee Torrent players
FC Tucson players
SV Horn players
FC Rot-Weiß Erfurt players
German expatriate footballers
German expatriate sportspeople in the United States
Expatriate soccer players in the United States
Expatriate footballers in Austria
Sportspeople from Marburg
Footballers from Hesse